The 2007 West Dorset District Council election was held on Thursday 3 May 2007 to elect councillors to West Dorset District Council in England. It took place on the same day as other district council elections in the United Kingdom. The entire council was up for election.

The 2007 election saw the Conservatives maintain their majority control of the District Council.

Ward results

Beaminster

Bradford Abbas

Bradpole

Bridport North

Bridport South & Bothenhampton

Broadmayne

Broadwindsor

Burton Bradstock

Cam Vale

Charminster & Cerne Valley

Charmouth

Chesil Bank

Chickerell

Chideock & Symondsbury

Dorchester East

Dorchester North

Dorchester South

Dorchester West

Frome Valley

Halstock

Loders

Lyme Regis

Maiden Newton

Marshwood Vale

Netherbury

Owermoigne

Piddle Valley

Puddletown

Queen Thorne

Sherborne East

Sherborne West

Winterborne St Martin

Yetminster

References

West Dorset
2007
2000s in Dorset